Eyes of a Child is a 1995 legal thriller novel by Richard North Patterson, and is rated as one of the top ten legal thrillers by Narayan Radhakrishnan.

References

Legal thriller novels
1995 novels